Latham's snipe (Gallinago hardwickii), also known as the Japanese snipe, is a medium-sized, long-billed, migratory snipe of the East Asian–Australasian Flyway.

Description
The snipe is 29–33 cm long, with a wingspan of 50–54 cm and weight of 150–230 g.

Identification
It is identifiable as a Gallinago snipe by its cryptically-patterned black, brown, buff and white plumage, but is not easily distinguished from Swinhoe's and pin-tailed snipe in the field, though it is slightly larger.

Distribution and habitat
The snipe breeds mainly in Hokkaidō in northern Japan, with smaller numbers on Honshū, the eastern Russian mainland and Sakhalin and, historically, the Kurile Islands.  The entire population migrates and spends the non-breeding season principally in eastern Australia, where it is the commonest Gallinago snipe.  It has been recorded on migration in Taiwan, the Philippines and New Guinea, and is a rare straggler to New Zealand.

The snipe's breeding habitat in Asia includes alpine moorland, grasslands, rough pasture, young tree plantations and cultivated areas.  Non-breeding habitat in Australia is shallow freshwater wetlands of various kinds, with bare mud or shallow water for feeding and nearby vegetation cover for shelter.

Behaviour

Breeding
Courtship consists of display flights and drumming by the males.  It nests on the ground, concealed in vegetation, with a clutch of four eggs.

Feeding
Latham's snipe is an omnivorous species that feeds on seeds and other plant material (mainly from species in families such as Cyperaceae, Poaceae, Juncaceae, Polygonaceae, Ranunculaceae and Fabaceae), and on invertebrates including insects (mainly flies and beetles), earthworms, spiders and occasionally molluscs, isopods and centipedes.

Status and conservation
Internationally, Latham's snipe is considered to be a species near threatened.  In Australia it was previously hunted as a gamebird but is now fully protected. It is listed as "rare" under South Australia's National Parks and Wildlife Act 1972.

References

 BirdLife International. (2006). Species factsheet: Gallinago hardwickii.  Downloaded from http://www.birdlife.org on 9 February 2007
 Fujimaki, Y.; & Skira, I.J. (1984). Notes on Latham's Snipe, Gallinago hardwickii, in Japan. Emu 84: 49–51.
 Higgins, P.J.; & Davies, J.N. (eds). (1996). Handbook of Australian, New Zealand and Antarctic Birds.  Volume 3: Snipe to Pigeons. Oxford University Press: Melbourne.  
 Lane, Brett; & Davies, Jeff. (1987). Shorebirds in Australia. RAOU: Melbourne. 

Latham's snipe
Shorebirds
Birds of Japan
Birds of Oceania
Latham's snipe
Latham's snipe